The Fischer Catalogue of Polish stamps (Katalog Polskich Znaków Pocztowych ) is a yearly publication in catalogue form of postage stamps relating to Poland.

The purpose of the catalogue is to describe postage stamps related to Poland and to estimate their value in the philatelic market.

Publisher 

The catalogue is published in Poland by Firma Handlowo-Usługowa Andrzej Fischer, 41-902 Bytom, Rynek 11. Editor/publishers are Andrzej Fischer, Stanisław Styła, and Jerzy Walocha.

Format 

The catalogue is issued yearly in two volumes: Tom I and Tom II. All postage stamps are illustrated in full colour. Value of individual stamps is listed in Polish currency. An introduction has sections written in Polish, German, and also in English.

Content 
The catalogue covers the full extent of Polish philately and is comprehensive in the following categories.
 Postage stamps of Poland
 City locals
 Austrian occupation
 German occupation
 Military mail
 Exile stamps
 Propaganda stamps
 Post-wartime overprints
 Prisoner-of-war
 Displaced persons
 Postal stationery
 Plebiscite issues
 Port Gdansk
 Cinderellas
 Charity stamps

Expertise 
 
The catalogue lists a number of experts who can verify authenticity of rare Polish stamps. These experts are listed under “Lista ekspertów Polskiego Związku Filatelistów i ekspertów międzynarodowych.”

Availability 

The catalogue is available in Poland, as well as in the United States and Canada. Requests for information related to the purchase of the catalogs should be directed to the Polonus philatelic society, located in Chicago, Illinois.

See also
 List of stamp catalogues
 Polonus Philatelic Society
 Postage stamps and postal history of Poland

References

 Katalog Polskich Znaków Pocztowych 
 Stamp Encyclopaedia Poland

Philately of Poland
Stamp catalogs